El Watan (Arabic:الوطن, meaning the Homeland) is an independent French-language newspaper in Algeria.

History and profile
The paper was founded in 1990 after Omar Belhouchet and nineteen colleagues left the FLN government-owned newspaper El Moudjahid.

It aims to promote democracy and to give coverage to the Algerian opposition, and has acted as an outspoken voice against censorship and corruption. It has been suspended several times by the Algerian government, and journalists and editors jailed for various offenses. Its reporters have, according to the international press watchdogs Reporters Without Borders (RSF) and Committee to Protect Journalists (CPJ) been targeted by both government forces and Islamist insurgents.

In July 2007, the paper started the first weekend edition in Algeria. Subsequently, the newspaper started economic, real estate, and television supplements, with the goal of having one supplement per day. In 2008, El Watan launched a trilingual Arabic, English, and French website. Fayçal Métaoui, an El Watan journalist, said that the paper created the website because its most significant competition originated from Arabic-language and English-language news sites.

The paper's online version was the 45th most visited website for 2010 in the MENA region.

See also 

 List of newspapers in Algeria
 Censorship in Algeria
 Vatan

References

External links 
  El Watan homepage
 El-Watan ordered to pay fine – IFEX

1991 establishments in Algeria
Newspapers published in Algeria
French-language newspapers published in Algeria
Publications established in 1991
Mass media in Algiers